The Grič Tunnel is a four-lane tunnel in Lika region of Croatia, an integral part of the A1 motorway located between Otočac and Ličko Lešće interchanges. The Grič Tunnel is located to the south of Plasina Tunnel. The tunnel is tolled within the A1 motorway closed toll collection system, and there are no separate toll plazas related to the tunnel use.

The tunnel consists of two tubes, excavated in 2003 and opened for traffic in 2004. Electronic equipment of the tunnel facilitates use of two UHF frequencies (HR1 102.3 MHz and HR2 97.5 MHz) and use of cell phones. Speed limit applied in the tunnel is 100 km/h. In 2006 the Grič Tunnel was declared to be the second safest tunnel in Europe by the EuroTAP survey run by FIA and the German motoring club ADAC.

Traffic volume 

Traffic is regularly counted and reported by Hrvatske autoceste, operator of the A1 motorway, and published by Hrvatske ceste. Substantial variations between annual (AADT) and summer (ASDT) traffic volumes are attributed to the fact that the motorway carries substantial tourist traffic to the Dalmatian Adriatic resorts. The traffic count is performed using analysis of toll ticket sales.

See also 
 A1 motorway
 Mala Kapela Tunnel
 Sveti Rok Tunnel
 List of longest tunnels

References

External links 

 
 EuroTAP

Road tunnels in Croatia
Buildings and structures in Lika-Senj County
Tunnels completed in 2004